4QInstruction,, also known as Sapiential Work A or Secret of the Way Things Are, is a Hebrew text among the Dead Sea Scrolls classified as wisdom literature. It is authored by a spiritual expert, directed towards a beginner. The author addresses how to deal with business and money issues in a godly manner, public affairs, leadership, marriage, children, and family, and how to live life righteously among secular society. There is some consensus that it dates to the third century BCE.

Manuscripts 
4QInstruction is preserved in at least seven fragmentary manuscripts from the Dead Sea Scrolls found in Qumran caves one and four, namely: 4Q415, 4Q416, 4Q417, 4Q418, 4Q418a, 4Q423, and 1Q26. These scrolls date approximately from the first century BCE and early first century CE.

History of scholarship 
Cave 1 materials were first published by Józef Milik in Discoveries in the Judaean Desert 1 in 1955. Cave 4 materials were published in the Discoveries in the Judean Desert series in 1999 by John Strugnell and Daniel Harrington. The document is written in Hebrew and is likely to be categorized as "non-sectarian" or perhaps "pre-sectarian".

Among the major studies published on the document are those by Armin Lange (1995), Daniel J. Harrington (1996), Torleif Elgvin (1998), John J. Collins (1999; 2003), Eibert Tigchelaar (2001), Matthew Goff (2003), Cana Werman (2004), Benjamin Wold (2018), and Jean-Sebastian Rey (2009).

Authorship and reception history 
Parts of six copies were discovered, indicating popularity and importance, especially to the supposed sect at Qumran. All of the Sapiential manuscripts are in Hebrew, which is deemed the original language of the text. The actual ancient title is unknown, but the frequent use of raz nihyeh, translating to "the mystery of existence," "approaching mystery," or "the way things are" gave reason to title the work "The Secret of the Way Things are". A well-accepted theory is that the Sapiential Work was a pre-Qumranic text. In other words, it was not written for an isolated sect, but it was directed toward a specific audience. Many scholars assume the text to either have existed before the formation of the sect, or to have been a precursor to sect involvement.

Parallels
Although there is no literal dependence between Daniel and the Sapiential Works, it is likely that they emerged from the same, or similar, scribal circles. Many phrases and ideas from Daniel pertaining to wisdom, revelation, and the elect recur in "The Secret of the Way Things Are." Similarly, both books reflect scribal activity with "a quest for divine communication," and "neither are concerned with the sacrificial cult of the Temple". The Work is also analogous to New Testament scripture, with recurring similarities found in Proverbs and the Gospel of Matthew. Although the terminology is not consistently parallel, the ideas and themes are comparable.

Contents 

This document continues to receive so much attention because it is viewed, on the one hand, as a wisdom document and yet, on the other, has multiple apocalyptic motifs that arise alongside  ones. Many major studies have asked questions about the relationship of wisdom to apocalypticism which has been part of a larger question about categorizing genres, schools and worldviews in Judaism in the Second Temple period.

One of the most discussed passages (4Q417 1 i lines 15–18) from this document is a fragmentary and cryptic description of what many view as angelic involvement in the creation of humanity, which is apparently described in reference to Genesis 1:26. Some translations find that humanity is divided into those who are among the "Spirit of Flesh" and the "Spiritual People". In addition to the fragmentary nature of these lines and the broader context, the identification of the "Vision of Hagu" and the "sons of Seth/perdition" have led to competing views about implications for the type, or even presence, of dualism that one should find in 4QInstruction.

Motifs
Although the text itself is not considered apocalyptic, and does not reflect the developed philosophical dualism of the War Scrolls or the Community Rule (1Qs), the text does reflect motifs of the end times, judgment, and a predestined division of good and evil. The overall ideas and form of the text are comparable to Proverbs, Jesus' instructions and parables in the New Testament gospels, the book of James, and especially the book of Daniel.

Women
An unusual aspect of this particular text is that it addresses women, which is very uncommon for an ancient Jewish text. 4Q413 appears to give advice to a woman, presumably the wife of the beginner being instructed. This particular section uses feminine verbal forms, rather than the singular forms used throughout the rest of the instruction.

Editions 
 Wise, Abegg, and Cook, The Dead Sea Scrolls: A New Translation, San Francisco: Harper, 2005.

Citations

References

Further reading 

 
 Adams, Samuel L. (2010). Rethinking the relationship between "4QInstruction" and "Ben Sira". Revue de Qumran, 555–583.
 Aitken, J. K. (1999). Apocalyptic, revelation and early Jewish wisdom literature. In New Heaven and New Earth. Prophecy and the Millennium (pp. 181–193). Brill.
 An, C. S. (2020). Re-Considering the Meaning and Function of the “Mystery” through the רן נהיה (Raz Nihyeh) in 4QInstruction. Canon & Culture, 14(1), 137–166.
 
 
 
 Berg, S. A. (2008). Religious epistemologies in the Dead Sea Scrolls: The heritage and transformation of the wisdom tradition. Yale University.
 
 Burns, J. E. (2004). Practical Wisdom in 4QInstruction. Dead Sea Discoveries, 12–42.
 
 
 
 Chazon, E. C. (1999). A Case of Mistaken Identity: Testament of Naphtali (4Q215) and Time of Righteousness (4Q215a). In The Provo International Conference on the Dead Sea Scrolls (pp. 110–123). Brill.
 
 Collins, John J. (1997). Wisdom reconsidered, in light of the Scrolls. Dead Sea Discoveries, 265–281.
 Collins, John J. (2003). The mysteries of God: creation and eschatology in 4QInstruction and the Wisdom of Solomon. Wisdom and apocalypticism in the Dead Sea Scrolls and in the biblical tradition, 287–305.
 
 Corley, J. (1999). Wisdom of Solomon. The Catholic Biblical Quarterly, 61(1), 120.
 Crenshaw, J. L. (2000). Jewish Wisdom in the Hellenistic Age. The Journal of the American Oriental Society, 120(1), 106-106.
 
 
 Elgvin, Torleif. (1997). An analysis of 4QInstruction. Jerusalem: Hebrew University of Jerusalem.
 Elgvin, Torleif. (2000). Wisdom and apocalypticism in the early second century BCE: the evidence of 4QInstruction. The Dead Sea scrolls fifty years after their discovery, 226–247.
 
 Elgvin, Torleif. (2009). From secular to religious language in 4QInstruction". Revue de Qumran, 24(1), 155–163.
 
 
 
 
 
 
 Goff, Matthew J. (2003). The Mystery of Creation in 4QInstruction. Dead Sea Discoveries, 163–186.
 Goff, Matthew J. (2004). Reading Wisdom at Qumran: 4QInstruction and the Hodayot. Dead Sea Discoveries, 263–288.
 Goff, Matthew J. (2005). Discerning trajectories: 4QInstruction and the sapiential background of the sayings source Q. Journal of Biblical Literature, 124(4), 657–673.
  Excerpt
 
 Goff, Matthew J. (2009). Recent trends in the study of early Jewish wisdom literature: The contribution of 4QInstruction and other Qumran texts. Currents in Biblical Research, 7(3), 376–416.
 
 Goff, Matthew J. (2013). 4QInstruction: A Commentary.
 
 Goff, Matthew J. (2017). Gardens of Knowledge: Teachers in Ben Sira, 4QInstruction, and the Hodayot. Pedagogy in Ancient Judaism and Early Christianity, 171–193.
 Goff, Matthew J., Rothschild, C. K., & Thompson, T. W. (2011). Being fleshly or spiritual: Anthropological reflection and exegesis of Genesis 1–3 in 4QInstruction and First Corinthians. Christian body, Christian self, 41–59.
 
 Harding, J. E. (2012). Divine knowledge in the Book of Job and 4QInstruction. Far from minimal: Celebrating the work and influence of Philip R. Davies, 173–192.
 Harding, J. E., & Davies, P. (2002). Qumran Cave 4. XXIV: Sapiential Texts, Part 2. 4QInstruction (Mûsār lěMēvîn): 4Q415ff. With a Re-Edition of 1Q26.
 
 Harrington, Daniel J. (1997). Ten reasons why the Qumran wisdom texts are important. Dead Sea Discoveries, 245–254.
 
 
 Harrington, Daniel J. (2003). Wisdom and Apocalyptic in 4QInstruction and 4 Ezra. Wisdom and apocalypticism in the Dead Sea Scrolls and in the biblical tradition, 343–355.
 
 Hogeterp, A. L. (2013). Immaterial wealth in Luke between wisdom and apocalypticism: Luke's Jesus tradition in light of 4QInstruction. Early Christianity, 4(1), 41–63.
 Jefferies, Daryl F. (2008). Scripture, Wisdom, and Authority in 4QInstruction: Understanding the use of Numbers 30: 8–9 in 4Q416. Hebrew Studies, 87–98.
  Adapted from 
 
 
 Kim, D. (2019). Qoheleth's Impact on the Qumranic Presentation of the Eschatological Worldview (4QMysteries and 4QInstruction). 성경원문연구, (45), 201–234.
 
 Lim, Timothy H. (2010). 4QInstruction: Sagesse et eschatologie. The Catholic Biblical Quarterly, 72(2), 357.
 Lockett, D. R. (2005). The spectrum of wisdom and eschatology in the epistle of James and 4QInstruction. Tyndale Bulletin, 56(2), 131. https://legacy.tyndalehouse.com/tynbul/Library/TynBull_2005_56_2_08_Lockett_James_4QInstruction.pdf
 
 
 
 
 
 
 
 
 
 
 
 
 
 
 
 
 
 
 
 
 Stuckenbruck, L. T. (2002). 4QInstruction and the possible influence of early Enochic traditions: an evaluation. The wisdom texts from Qumran and the development of sapiential thought, 245–261.
 
 
 
 
 Tigchelaar, Eibert J. C. (2002). Towards a reconstruction of the beginning of 4QInstruction:(4Q416 fragment 1 and parallels). The wisdom texts from Qumran and the development of sapiential thought, 99–126.
 
 
 Tysk, S. (2021). The Human and the Creation in Relation to the Narrative of the Divine An Ecological Reading of the Letter to the Romans in Comparison with 4QInstruction.
 
 
 
 
 Wold, Benjamin G. (2003). To Increase Learning for the Understanding Ones: Reading and Reconstructing the Fragmentary Early Jewish Sapiential Text 4QInstruction.
 
 
 Wold, Benjamin G. (2007). Metaphorical poverty in Musar leMevin. Journal of Jewish studies., 58(1), 140–153.
 
 Wold, Benjamin G. (2013). The universality of creation in "4QInstruction". Revue de Qumran, 211–226.
 
 
 
 
 
 Wold, Benjamin G., Stuckenbruck, L. T., & Boccaccini, G. (2016). Jesus among Wisdom's representatives: 4QInstruction. Enoch and the Synoptic Gospels: Reminiscences, Allusions, Intertextuality, 44, 317.
 

2nd-century BCE texts
3rd-century BCE texts
Ancient Hebrew texts
Dead Sea Scrolls
Essene texts
Wisdom literature